Darrow School is an independent, co-educational college-preparatory school for boarding and day students in grades 9-12 and PG.  Its New Lebanon campus is a  property just to the west of the boundary between New York and Massachusetts in the Taconic Mountains and within the Berkshire cultural region.

History
The school's campus is located at the site of the largest and most industrious Shaker community in the country. Darrow opened in the fall of 1932 as the Lebanon School for Boys. It was renamed "Darrow School" in 1939 in honor of the Darrow family, who settled the land and provided support and leadership in the early years of the Shaker community. In the later part of the 20th century Darrow began to accept female students.

More than a decade before the last of the Shakers left in 1947, they set in motion plans for a school. In 1932, the school opened its doors, re-purposing many of the original Shaker buildings as classrooms, meeting, dining, and athletic facilities, and dormitories for both students and teachers. Darrow School's buildings have been well maintained throughout the school's 83-year history, and although some accommodations have been made for modern living and learning, all renovations have been conducted in consideration of the Shaker principles of simplicity, function, beauty, and stewardship of both the historic site and the earth.

Academics
The curriculum is rooted in the liberal arts and sciences.

Hands-to-Work is a service opportunity that occurs every Wednesday morning. Rather than having classes on Wednesday, students work on- and off-campus doing volunteer work. Some examples of Hand-to-Work projects are: maple sugaring, kitchen crew, service at the Berkshire Humane Society, and literary magazine.

Student body
The school currently enrolls about 110 students. Students come from New York and Massachusetts, however, the school has a sizable population from other states as well as countries such as Dominica, China, United Arab Emirates, Vietnam, and South Korea.

Campus
Darrow occupies the 365-acre (1.48 km2) site and buildings of an original Shaker village that has been designated a National Historic Landmark. Darrow has 26 buildings, 4 playing fields, 2 tennis courts, 5 residential dormitories, the 15,000-volume Heyniger Memorial Library (a former Shaker facility originally known as the Second Meeting House), the 12,000-square-foot (1,100 m2) Joline Arts Center (opened in 2002), and a three-building science facility. In 2018, the Kurtz Innovation Center was opened in the Science Building. Renovated in 2018, the largest building on campus, known as the Dairy Barn, comprises the Darrow Theater, the gymnasium and locker rooms, the Dining Room and kitchen, and the Kamenstein Student Center. The building also contains the Performing Arts Center (PAC), a facility that opened in 2015 for studies in music, theater, and film. The PAC has classrooms, a recording studio, and spaces for post-production.

Athletics
Student participate in a number of competitive and non-competitive sports during the 3 seasons that fall within the academic year. Students may elect to participate in any of the following:

Fall
Cross-country
Soccer
Outdoor Education
Theater
Mixed Martial Arts
Winter
Boys Basketball
Girls Basketball
Fitness and Conditioning
Alpine skiing/snowboarding
Spring
Lacrosse
Softball
Tennis
Ultimate Frisbee
Outdoor Education

Cost and financial aid
Tuition, room and board for the 2020–2021 school year is $61,000. Need-based financial aid is available by applying through School and Student Services.

Recognition
The National Association of Independent Schools (NAIS) has recognized The Darrow School as a Leading Edge Honoree for its curriculum innovation, specifically in the area of sustainability. The School's Sustainability Program is an important feature of the academic program and examines the relationship between people and their resources.

Notable alumni
Charles "Pete" Conrad, Jr., Apollo 12 commander and third man to walk on the Moon. Darrow Class of 1949
Chris "Mad Dog" Russo, sportscaster and radio personality. Darrow Class of 1978
Sam Harper, screenwriter of Cheaper by the Dozen and Cheaper by the Dozen 2. Darrow Class of 1974
August François von Finck, German businessman
Christopher Lloyd, actor who appeared in Taxi and Back to the Future
William H. Hudnut III, mayor of Indianapolis
Donald Cushing McGraw, Jr., American businessman, Darrow Class of 1943

References

External links

 

Private high schools in New York (state)
Schools in Columbia County, New York
Educational institutions established in 1932
1932 establishments in New York (state)
Mount Lebanon Shaker Society